Emancipation generally means to free a person from a previous restraint or legal disability.  More broadly, it is also used for efforts to procure economic and social rights, political rights or equality, often for a specifically disenfranchised group, or more generally, in discussion of many matters. 

Among others, Karl Marx discussed political emancipation in his 1844 essay "On the Jewish Question", although often in addition to (or in contrast with) the term human emancipation. Marx's views of political emancipation in this work were summarized by one writer as entailing "equal status of individual citizens in relation to the state, equality before the law, regardless of religion, property, or other 'private' characteristics of individual people."

"Political emancipation" as a phrase is less common in modern usage, especially outside academic, foreign or activist contexts.  However, similar concepts may be referred to by other terms. For instance, in the United States the Civil Rights Movement culminated in the Civil Rights Act of 1964, the Voting Rights Act of 1965, and the Fair Housing Act of 1968, which can collectively be seen as further realization of events such as the Emancipation Proclamation and abolition of slavery a century earlier. In the current and former British West Indies islands the holiday Emancipation Day is celebrated to mark the end of the Atlantic slave trade.

Etymology 
The term emancipation derives from the Latin ēmancĭpo/ēmancĭpatio (the act of liberating a child from parental authority) which in turn stems from ē manu capere (capture from someone else's hand).

See also

 Abolitionism
 Catholic emancipation
 Dunmore's Proclamation
 Ecclesiastical emancipation
 Emancipation of minors
 Emancipation Proclamation
 Emancipation reform of 1861 in Russia
 Emancipist
 Emancipation Day
 Jewish emancipation
 Liberation (disambiguation)
 Manumission
 Political freedom
 Revolution (disambiguation)
 Self-determination
 Tanzimat
 Women's suffrage
 Youth rights

References

Further reading
Wolfdietrich Schmied-Kowarzik Karl Marx as a Philosopher of Human Emancipation, translated by Dylan C. Stewart

External links